Evercast is a privately held software as a service company that makes collaborative software primarily for the film, television, and other creative industry sectors. Its platform allows remotely located creative teams to collaborate in real-time on video production tasks, such as reviewing dailies, editing footage, sound mixing, animation, visual effects, and other components simultaneously. Its primary users are directors, editors, VFX artists, animators, and sound teams in the film, television, advertising, and video gaming industries.


History 
The company was founded in 2015 by Alex Cyrell, Brad Thomas, and Blake Brinker, and is based in Scottsdale, Arizona. After using the software, film editor Roger Barton joined the company and became a co-founder and investor. In 2020, Evercast won an Engineering Emmy award.

Funding 
In 2020, an unnamed angel investor provided just over $3 million of funding.

References 

Software companies based in Arizona
Collaborative software
Film editing
Web conferencing
Impact of the COVID-19 pandemic on science and technology
Software associated with the COVID-19 pandemic